The mixed 4 × 100 metre medley relay event at the 2020 Summer Olympics was held in 2021 at the Tokyo Aquatics Centre. These Games marked the first time to feature a mixed-gender swimming event in the program. Each 4-person team features two male and two female swimmers in no particular order.

The medals for the competition were presented by Kirsty Coventry IOC Executive Board Member, Zimbabwe; Olympian, 2 Gold Medals, 4 Silver Medals, 1 Bronze Medal, and the medalists' bouquets were presented by Errol Clarke, FINA Bureau Member; Barbados.

Records
Prior to this competition, the existing world and Olympic records were as follows.

The following records were established during the competition:

Qualification

The top 12 teams in this event at the 2019 World Aquatics Championships qualified for the Olympics. An additional 4 teams will qualify through having the fastest times at approved qualifying events during the qualifying period (1 March 2019 to 30 May 2020).

Race rules
Each team has two male and two female swimmers. Each team decides whether a man or a woman will swim a specific stroke, which means men versus women is possible in a specific stroke, as happened in heats and in finals. Strokes order are in the same order as in a traditional medley race–backstroke, breaststroke, butterfly and freestyle.

The competition consists of two rounds: heats and a final. The relay teams with the best 8 times in the heats advance to the final. Swim-offs are used as necessary to break ties for advancement to the next round.

Schedule
All times are Japan Standard Time (UTC+9)

Results

Heats
The relay teams with the top 8 times, regardless of heat, advanced to the final.

Final

References

Mixed 4 x 100 metre medley relay
Olympics
Mixed events at the 2020 Summer Olympics